The U.S Highways in Arizona are the segments of the United States Numbered Highways that run within the U.S. state of Arizona.

History
The United States Numbered Highway System (U.S. Highway System) was originally approved by the American Association of State Highway Officials (AASHO) with assistance by the United States Department of Agriculture Joint Board on Interstate Highways on November 11, 1926. The Arizona State Highway Department (ASHD) formally recognized the U.S. Highways on September 9, 1927, during the establishment of the Arizona State Highway System. When the U.S. Highways within Arizona were first being planned, the proposed routes consisted of U.S. Route 60 (US 60) from Topock to Lupton, US 70 from Holbrook to New Mexico, US 80 from Yuma to New Mexico, US 89 from Flagstaff to Utah, US 91 from Nevada to Utah through the Arizona Strip, US 180 from Florence Junction to New Mexico, US 280 from Ash Fork to Phoenix and US 380 from Tucson to Nogales. When the system was commissioned however, noticeable changes had been made. US 60 had been renumbered to US 66 and US 280 and US 380 became a southern extension of US 89. This also meant US 89 shared a long concurrency with US 80 between Phoenix and Tucson, as well as a wrong-way concurrency with US 66 between Flagstaff and Ash Fork.

In 1931, US 70 became the first U.S. Highway to be decommissioned in Arizona. It was replaced by US 60 between Springerville and New Mexico, and by a newly commissioned highway designated US 260 between Holbrook and Springerville. US 60 had also been established over other existing state highways from Ehrenberg to Springerville, creating a concurrency with US 80 and US 89 between Phoenix and Florence Junction. US 70 was given a new routing between Clovis and El Paso, Texas via Alamogordo, New Mexico. US 180 was re-designated as part of a new extension of US 70 through Arizona in 1935. US 70 also ran entirely concurrent with US 60 from Ehrenberg to Globe. 1935 was also the year US 466 and US 93 were extended southeast from Nevada to Kingman, by way of the recently completed Boulder Dam (now Hoover Dam). Both US 93 and US 466 were entirely concurrent with each other in Arizona. By 1939, US 666 had been extended south into Arizona, at a terminus with US 80 in Douglas. US 666 was concurrent with US 66 between Lupton and Sanders, US 260 from St. Johns to Alpine and US 70 between San Jose and Safford. By this time, US 260 had also been extended southeast to New Mexico. In 1941, an alternate route of US 89 known as US 89A had been established over former State Route 79 (SR 79) between Prescott and Flagstaff, via Jerome and Sedona.

Following the end of the Second World War, traffic had greatly increased on the U.S. Highway System throughout the country, resulting in an increase of traffic accidents and rough road conditions. These factors would contribute to the Federal Aid Highway Act of 1956, which established the Interstate and Defense Highway System (which are often referred to as "Interstates" for short) was established. This new network of nationwide freeways was slated to replace the heaviest traveled U.S. Highways and state highways in the country. Five Interstates were planned in Arizona to supplant or bypass existing U.S. Highways. US 60 between Ehrenberg and Phoenix was to be replaced by the western section of the newly planned Interstate 10 (I-10), I-8 and the eastern section of I-10 were to bypass or replace the entirety of US 80, I-40 was to replace the entirety of US 66, I-17 and I-19 were to replace parts of US 89 and I-15 was to replace all of US 91. Construction of the Interstate Highway system was well underway by 1957.

Despite the introduction of the Interstates, attention was still paid to designating new U.S. Highways or altering the routes of existing examples. In 1959, US 89 between Utah and Bitter Springs was moved onto a new route through Page over the Glen Canyon Dam. The older route between Utah and Bitter Springs became a northern extension of US 89A. In 1960, the southern section of SR 95 between Quartzsite and San Luis was re-designated as an extension of US 95. The remainder of US 95 in Arizona was concurrent with US 60 (future I-10) between Ehrenberg and Quartzsite. By 1963, US 260 had been decommissioned and made into a western extension of US 180. US 180 was also extended over US 66 from Holbrook to Flagstaff and replaced SR 164 between Flagstaff and Valle. In 1965, sections of SR 64 and SR 364 between US 89 and Four Corners were designated as part of the new US 164. US 164 was also concurrent with US 89 between former SR 64 and US 66 in Flagstaff.

List

Special routes

Historic routes

These are historic U.S. Highways recognized by the ADOT Parkways, Historic and Scenic Roads Program.

See also

References

External links

U.S. Highways